Camille Flers, born in Paris in 1802, was a painter of landscapes and a scholar of Pâris. His Views of Normandy and The Banks of the Marne and Eure display a great amount of study and power or feeling in the colouring. He died at Annet (Seine-et-Marne) Paris in 1868. He was the instructor of Cabats. In the Louvre is a landscape by this artist of the Environs of Paris.

References

 

1802 births
1868 deaths
Painters from Paris
French landscape painters
19th-century French painters
French male painters
19th-century French male artists